Kinshasa One Two is an album recorded by Damon Albarn alongside ten producers of the newly established DRC Music (Democratic Republic of the Congo Music) group, to benefit Oxfam's work in Congo.

Background
Recorded in Kinshasa, Congo, within five out of nine days spent there during July 2011, the album was intended to shine a light on contemporary Congolese musicians, featuring more than 50 local performers, notably Nelly Liyemge, Jupiter Bokondji & Okwess International and Bokatola System. DRC Music is composed of producers Damon Albarn, Dan the Automator, XL Recordings managers Richard Russell & Rodaidh McDonald, Jneiro Jarel, DJ Darren Cunningham aka Actress, Marc Antoine, Alwest, Remi Kabaka Jr., Totally Enormous Extinct Dinosaurs and Kwes.

Album was released digitally by Warp Records on 3 October 2011, followed by a CD edition in digipak and a deluxe vinyl edition plus three bonus tracks later on 7 November 2011, with album artwork by Aitor Throup and Hardy Blechman.

Song information
Damon Albarn himself sings on "Hallo", also the only single from the album, released promotionally on compact disc. The song "Love" is completely a cappella with no music and serves both as an interlude and prelude to "Lingala". There is a hidden track only on the CD. Also, a code to access three further bonus tracks, including a heavy version of track 6, "Lourds", is given in the CD/vinyl booklets.

Track listing

Personnel

 Damon Albarn – vocals, synthesizer, bass guitar, omnichord, producer, programming
 Richard Russell – producer, engineer, programming, effects
 Dan the Automator – producer
 Jneiro Jarel – producer
 Actress – producer
 Totally Enormous Extinct Dinosaurs – producer
 Marc Antoine – producer
 Alwest – producer
 Remi Kabaka Jr. – producer
 Rodaidh McDonald – producer, engineer
 Kwes – producer
 Stephen Sedgwick – engineer, mixing
 John Foyle – assistant engineer
 Kevin Metcalfe – mastering
 Aitor Throup – art direction
 Hardy Blechman – art direction
 Simon Phipps – photography
 Gareth Pritchard – retouching
 Tout Puissant Mukalo – vocals
 Nelly Liyemge – vocals
 N’Gotshima – vocals
 Bebson – vocals
 Ewing Sima – vocals, percussion
 Love – vocals
 Bokatola System – vocals, percussion, producer
 Evala Litongo – vocals
 Yende Bongongo – vocals, producer
 Loi X Liberal – vocals
 Magakala Virginia Yollande – vocals
 Yowa Hollande – vocals
 Jupiter Bokondji – vocals
 Washiba – vocals
 Cubain Kabeya – drums, percussion
 Okwess International – percussion
 Odon Asok – percussion
 Boyo Kani – percussion
 Lionel Kizaba – percussion
 Pay Kumbi – percussion
 Bercy Makamba – percussion
 Michel Nsimi – percussion
 Bitsindou Scafio – percussion
 Pierre Sylvaine – percussion
 Djanga Weny – percussion
 Tshetshe Yenge – percussion
 Tshamala Mufubela – flute
 Padou Nkoyi – guitar

Release history

Physical release: 7 November 2011

References

External links
 
 
 

2011 albums
Damon Albarn albums
Collaborative albums
Warp (record label) albums
Albums produced by Dan the Automator
Albums produced by Kwes
Worldbeat albums